Brian Salmon (born 5 April 1978) is an English former professional snooker player.

Career

Salmon turned professional in 2000. During the 2001/2001 season, he reached the last 80 at the 2001 European Open, defeating former World Champion Joe Johnson 5–4 and Jeff Cundy 5–1 before losing 5–0 to Paul Davies.

After that season, Salmon did not play competitively until 2003; in the 2003/2004 season, he won an event on the Challenge Tour to regain his place on the professional tour. In Event 3, Salmon beat Steve Harrison, David Craggs, Tony Knowles, Dermot McGlinchey, David John and Mark Joyce, setting up an encounter in the final with Steve James, once the world number seven. Salmon made a break of 104 in a 6–2 victory over James, recording his first tournament win.

Having re-qualified as a professional for the 2004/2005 season, Salmon could not find any form in the ranking events; he won only one match, beating Scott MacKenzie 5–1 in the Irish Masters, and his hopes of progressing in the 2005 World Championship were ended by a 3–10 loss to Adrian Gunnell.

Ranked 87th, Salmon fell off the tour again and returned to the amateur game in 2005.

Performance and rankings timeline

Career finals

Non-ranking event finals: 1 (1 title)

References

English snooker players
Living people
Place of birth missing (living people)
1978 births